Brantley County High School is a public high school located in Nahunta, Georgia, United States. The school is part of the Brantley County School District, which serves Brantley County.

References

External links
 
 Brantley County School District website

Schools in Brantley County, Georgia
Public high schools in Georgia (U.S. state)